The women's 100 metre freestyle competition of the swimming events at the 2011 World Aquatics Championships was held in July 2011; the heats and the semifinals were held on 28 July and the final on 29 July.

Records
Prior to the competition, the existing world and championship records were as follows.

Results

Heats
77 swimmers participated in 10 heats.

Semifinals
The semifinals were held at 18:02.

Semifinal 1

Semifinal 2

Final
The final was held at 18:02.

References

External links
2011 World Aquatics Championships: Women's 100 metre freestyle start list, from OmegaTiming.com; retrieved 2011-07-23.

Freestyle 0100 metre, women's
World Aquatics Championships
2011 in women's swimming